Maxwell Technologies Inc. is an American developer and manufacturer headquartered in San Diego, California. The company focuses on developing and manufacturing energy storage and power delivery products for automotive, heavy transportation, renewable energy, backup power, wireless communications and industrial and consumer electronics applications.

History
The company was founded in 1965 as Maxwell Laboratories Inc. by Raymond C. O'Rourke, Alan Kolb, Bruce Hayworth, and Terrence C. Gooding in San Diego, California. Maxwell Laboratories was originally a government contractor, providing advanced physics, pulsed power, space effects analysis and other research and development services to the U.S. military and other government agencies. The company began converting its focus to commercial applications for its technologies and products in the early 1990s, and by 2014, generated all of its revenue from commercial sources. In 1996, Maxwell Laboratories, Inc. changed its name to Maxwell Technologies, Inc.

Maxwell Energy Products, a division that included the Maxwell High Voltage Capacitor product line, was acquired in March 2000 by General Atomics, eventually merging into General Atomics Electronic Systems, Inc. in 2003.

In 2007, Maxwell Technologies won  contract from Astrium Satellites to supply computers for European Space Agency’s ‘Gaia’ Astronomy mission. Maxwell supplied seven Maxwell SCS750 SBCs to process images and data gathered by the satellite's camera.

In November 2013, Maxwell Technologies opened a manufacturing facility in Peoria, Arizona.

In December 2013, Maxwell Technologies signed a memorandum of understanding (MOU) with SK Innovation to develop the next generation of electrical energy storage with Maxwell's ultracapacitors and SK's lithium-ion batteries.

In April 2016, Maxwell completed the sale of its microelectronics product line to Data Device Corporation.

In April 2017, Maxwell Technologies acquired all assets, "core business and operating entities" of Nesscap Energy Inc. for  $23.175 million.

In February 2019, electric vehicle and clean energy company Tesla, Inc. announced that it planned to acquire Maxwell Technologies. In July 2021, Tesla CEO Elon Musk acknowledged that Tesla had sold Maxwell Technologies to a San Diego-based startup called Ucap Power, which is led by Gordon Schenk, previously the VP of sales for Maxwell.

References

Technology companies of the United States
Capacitor manufacturers
Technology companies established in 1965
1965 establishments in California
Manufacturing companies based in San Diego
Tesla, Inc.
2019 mergers and acquisitions
2021 mergers and acquisitions